In 2016 the Women's Engineering Society (WES), in collaboration with the Daily Telegraph, produced an inaugural list of the United Kingdom's Top 50 Influential Women in Engineering, which was published on National Women in Engineering Day on 23 June 2016. The event was so successful it became an annual celebration. The list was instigated by Dawn Bonfield MBE, then Chief Executive of the Women's Engineering Society. In 2019, WES ended its collaboration with the Daily Telegraph and started a new collaboration with The Guardian newspaper.

2016 Winners: Most Influential Women in Engineering
The judging panel was chaired by Dawn Bonfield MBE, and included Leon Krill from the Daily Telegraph, Allan Cook CBE, chairman of Atkins, Professor John Perkins, author of the Engineering Skills Survey from the University of Manchester, Fiona Tatton, editor of Womanthology and Michelle Richmond, director of membership and professional development at the Institution of Engineering and Technology.

 Roma Agrawal CEng, MIStructE, MIET, FRICS   structural engineer, associate director, AECOM
 Professor Helen Atkinson CBE, FREng   head of Department of Engineering, University of Leicester
 Danella Bagnall   chief product engineer, Jaguar Land Rover
 Faye Banks FIET, FCMI, FinstLm, CEng, Cmgr   head of operations North East, National Grid
 Alison Baptiste CEng, FICE, BEng, MSc, MCIWEM   director of strategy and investment, Flood and Coastal Risk Management, Environment Agency
 Jayne Bryant FREng, CEng, FIET, FWES   engineering director defence information, BAE Systems
 Muffy Calder OBE, FRSE, FREng    vice-principal and head of College of Science and Engineering, University of Glasgow
 Liv Carroll DIC, CGeol, FGS, FIMMM   Chartered Geologist, Geological Society
 Jacqueline Castle CEng, FIMechE, FRAeS   chief engineer A330neo Wing, Airbus UK
 Amanda Chessell CBE, FREng    distinguished engineer, IBM
 Naomi Climer FREng, CEng, FIET president, IET, Institution of Engineering and Technology
 Susan Dio   chief executive officer, BP Shipping Limited
 Dr Michèle Dix CBE, CEng, FICE, FCIHT, FCILT managing director, Crossrail 2, Transport for London (TfL)
 Professor Dame Ann Dowling president of the Royal Academy of Engineering, Professor of Mechanical Engineering, Deputy Vice-Chancellor, University of Cambridge
 Elizabeth Eastaugh global head - customer experience, Expedia
 Dawn Elizabeth Elson CEng, FICE, FIMechE, FRAeS, FWES   group engineering director, Merlin Entertainments Group
 Jane Gartshore FInstR  director, Cool Concerns Ltd
 Professor Lynn Gladden CBE, FRS, FREng   Shell Professor of Chemical Engineering, University of Cambridge
 Dr Paulina Bohdanowicz-Godfrey director energy and environment, Hilton Worldwide
 Dame Judith Hackitt CBE, FREng chair, EEF
 Professor Dame Wendy Hall DBE, FRS, FREng  director, Web Science Institute, University of Southampton
 Eur Ing Louise Hardy CEng, FICE, CMgr, FCMI, FWES   non-executive director, Sirius Minerals Plc
 Professor Caroline Hargrove CEng, FIMechE technical director, McLaren Applied Technologies
 Professor Karen Holford FREng, FWES, FLSW, CEng, FIMechE   pro vice-chancellor, Cardiff University
 Ying Hu  manufacturing systems engineer, Rolls-Royce Plc
 Dame Sue Ion FREng, FRS chair NIRAB, Nuclear Innovation and Research Advisory Board
 Lady Barbara Judge CBE chairman emeritus, UK Atomic Energy Authority
 Julia King, Baroness Brown of Cambridge DBE, FREng   vice-chancellor and chief executive, Aston University
 Ailie MacAdam FICE, MIChemE managing director, Europe and Africa, Infrastructure, Bechtel
 Dr Cathy McClay head of commercial, electricity, National Grid
 Steph McGovern presenter, BBC Breakfast
 Linda Miller PEng (US) senior project manager, Bechtel
 Dervilla Mitchell CBE director, Arup
 Heidi Mottram OBE chief executive officer, Northumbrian Water Group
 Alison Nimmo CBE chief executive, The Crown Estate
 Belinda Oldfield FICE, AMIoW   general manager, Scottish Water
 Chi Onwurah MP, CEng, FIET, FCGI   MP, UK Government
 Isobel Pollock-Hulf OBE, CEng, Hon DSc, FIMechE, FCGI   Master, Worshipful Company of Engineers
 Dr Haifa Ross head of School of Engineering, Solihull College and University Centre
 Helen Samuels United Utilities
 Dr Angela Seeney FEI, CEng, CEng, CPet Eng   director technology, supply chain and decommissioning, Oil & Gas Authority
 Dr Nina Skorupska CBE, FEI   chief executive, Renewable Energy Association
 Jane Simpson chief engineer, Network Rail
 Dana Skelley OBE   director of asset management, Transport for London
 Rachel Skinner CEng, FICE, TPP, MCIHT   director of development, WSP Parsons Brinckerhoff
 Dr Debbie Smith  OBE, FIFE, CPhys, MInstP   managing director, BRE Global
 Vicky Stewart MIOA, MWED   associate acoustic consultant, Atkins
 Eleanor Stride professor of engineering science, University of Oxford
 Dr Alison Vincent chief technology officer, Cisco International Ltd
 Katherine Ward CEng, MICE   group head, offshore wind, Atkins

2017 Winners (Theme: Most Influential Women in Engineering Under 35)
The judging panel included Dr Pete Thompson, CEO, NPL, Gillian Arnold, director, Tectre, Clare Lavelle, associate director, Arup, John McCollum, head of Engineering, BAE, Benita Mehra, WES President, Kirsten Bodley, WES CEO, Isobel Pollock-Hulf, WES Patron.

 Kimberley Abbott, Customer Innovation & Strategic Growth Developer, Thales UK          
 Dr Nadia Abdul-Karim, lecturer, Cranfield Forensics Institute, Cranfield University
 Lucy Ackland, Senior Development Engineer, Renishaw plc
 Pavlina Akritas, Associate, Arup
 Maela Baker, Civil Engineer, Pick Everard 
 Camilla  Barrow, Deputy Project Manager, Bechtel Ltd   
 Chloe Branston, Advanced Apprentice (CAD Designer), Cavendish Nuclear  
 Victoria Brown, Maintenance Apprentice Coordinator, EDF Energy 
 Kerrine Bryan, Chartered Electrical Engineer / Author, Butterfly Books Limited
 Abi Bush, Technical Advisor, Field Ready
 Angela Carr, Mechanical Engineer, EDF Energy   
 Kim Cave-Ayland, Control Engineer, UK Atomic Energy Authority
 Helena Conceicao, Senior Project Manager, Carillion  
 Sophie Dent, Systems Engineer Graduate, BAE Systems - Submarines  
 Priyanka Dhopade, senior research associate, Department of Engineering Science, University of Oxford 
 Frances Dixon, Construction Manager, Colas Ltd.
 Louise Ellis, Senior Engineer, Ove Arup and Partners Ltd    
 Ozak Esu, Electrical Engineer, Cundall     
 Lidia Galdino, research associate, University College London   
 Claire Gott, Design Manager and UK Head of Corporate Social Responsibility, WSP 
 Louise Hall, Commercial Services Manager, Environment Agency
 Nikita Hari, Doctoral Scholar & Social Tech Entrepreneur, University of Cambridge    
 Sophie Harker, Aerodynamics and Performance Engineer, BAE Systems 
 Gemma Holmes, Site Manager, JN Bentley Ltd   
 Jodie Howlett, Product Definition Engineer (Year in Industry Student), Rolls-Royce    
 Abbie Hutty, Lead Spacecraft Structures Engineer, ExoMars Rover, Airbus   
 Nada Issa, Intermediate Mechanical Engineer, ChapmanBDSP   
 Jessica Leigh Jones, Engineer, Sony      
 Lynsey Lennon, Performance Team Leader, Scottish Water  
 Nan Li, Lecturer, Imperial College London
 Eva Linnell, Senior Engineer, Atkins   
 Susan McDonald, Senior Consultant in Infrastructure & Capital Projects, Deloitte    
 Orla Murphy, Forward Model Quality Engineer, Jaguar Land Rover 
 Áine Ní Bhreasail, Geotechnical Engineer, Arup
 Kimberley Norris, Systems Engineer, Leonardo MW Ltd  
 Hiteshree (Tesh) Patel, Software Manager, Dyson 
 Victoria Richardson, Structural / Bridge Engineer, Arup 
 Victoria Roots, Senior Systems Engineer, BAE Systems 
 Sharon Ross, Senior Cluster Engineer, Mars Petcare       
 Marie Sebban-Lee, Associate (Environmental), ChapmanBDSP   
 Lauren Shea, Arkwright Scholar/TeenTech Ambassador/A-level Student, Alton Convent School  
 Lara Small, Manufacturing Engineering Manager, Rolls-Royce & British Army Royal Engineers  
 Jennifer Stables, Senior Engineer, AECOM       
 Lorna Tasker, Head of Rehabilitation Engineering, Morriston Hospital, Swansea 
 Samantha Thompson, Project Engineer, Dooson Babcock 
 Katy Toms, Infrastructure Engineer, AECOM   
 Elizabeth Waterman, Senior Engineer, PDL Solutions (Europe) Limited  
 Simone Weber, Technical Project Manager at Airbus Helicopters UK and researcher at Cranfield University
 Dr Catrin Ffion Williams, Ser Cymru Research Fellow, Cardiff University School of Engineering (High Frequency)  
 Amy Wright, Senior Site Engineer, Farrans

2018 Winners (Theme: Returners and Transferrers)

 Katie Atkinson, Materials Engineer, Jaguar Land Rover
 Kate Black, University Lecturer, University of Liverpool
 Cheryl Blenkinsop, Lead Engineer – Development, SP Energy Networks
 Emma Booth, Senior Project Manager, Black & Veatch
 Karen Britton, Technical Director, AECOM
 Emma Browning, Environment Manager, Scottish Power Renewables
 Antje Budge, Design Coordinator, Balfour Beatty
 Samantha Burchell, Operations Manager, UK Power Networks
 Isobel Byrne Hill, Senior Engineer, Arup
 Kate Cairns, Founder, Cairns Consultancy
 Savina Carluccio, Associate, Arup
 Dr Fiona Charnley, senior lecturer in Circular Innovation, Cranfield University
 Dr Sarah Chen, Civil Engineer, EDF Energy
 Dr Lorna Dallas, Graduate Safety Engineer, Babcock International Group
 Rachael De'Ath, Senior Engineer, Arup/Senior Teaching Associate, University of Bristol
 Kellie Dillon, Innovation Workstream Lead, UK Power Networks
 Agata Downey, Engineer, Elliott Wood
 Karen Friendship, Managing Director, Alderman Tooling Ltd
 Penny Gowler, Associate Director, Elliott Wood Partnership Ltd
 Nicola Grahamslaw, Ship's Conservation Engineer, SS Great Britain Trust
 Hilary Hill, Director of Engineering Operations, KBR UK Ltd
 Dr Isobel Houghton, Senior Engineer, Atkins
 Sharon Jones, Eagle Lab Engineer, Barclays Eagle Labs
 Katie Kelleher, Crane Operator, Laing O'Rourke
 Louisa King, Project Engineer, Waterco Consultants
 Keely King, Area Manager—Gas Mains Replacement, Triio
 Georgina Lockwood, Senior Engineer, Arup
 Leah Lucien, Graduate Mechanical Engineer, ChapmanBDSP
 Eur Ing Dr Phebe Mann , Chartered Engineer, Institution of Civil Engineers
 Stacey Marple, Project Development Manager, Monitor Coatings Ltd
 Lisa Matthews, Associate, Arup/CEO, HellyHolly
 Louise Maynard-Atem, Innovation Exchange Lead, BAE Systems
 Danielle McGrellis, Senior Engineer, Arup
 Angela McIntosh, Design Project Engineer, SP Energy Networks
 Carol Morris, Senior Lecturer-Engineering & Innovation, Open University
 Lisa Montague, Business Intelligence Engineer, BAE Systems
 Fi Neoh, Senior Consultant, Amey
 Hayley Oakes, Offshore Project Engineer, ODE
 Maria Ribera Vincent, teaching fellow, Imperial College London
 Nicole Saunders, Aviation Consultant, Osprey Consulting Services Ltd
 Professor Emma Sparks, Head of the Centre for Systems Engineering, Cranfield University
 Sarah Tattersall, associate, Arup
 Dr Emma Taylor, Lead Systems Safety Engineer, RSSB
 Julie Verrill, Junior Technician, Cundall
 Ruth Voisey, Senior Machine Learning Engineer, Dyson Technology Ltd
 Catherine Wenger, Director, Arup
 Tammy Whelan, Apprentice Civil Engineer, Arup
 Dr Connie Wilson, Senior Systems Engineer, BAE Systems Maritime – Naval Ships
 Kate Young, Senior Mechanical Engineer, Skanska
 Ellie Zemani, Project Engineer, Spirit Energy

2019 Winners (Theme: Current and Former Apprentices)

The event was held at the Royal Academy of Engineering in 2019 and the Women's Engineering Society moved to collaborate with the Guardian newspaper, who published a supplement containing details of the winners on the 24 June 2019 to celebrate International Women in Engineering Day 2020. The date also marked 100 years since the formation of the Society. The judging panel consisted of Head Judge Dawn Fitt OBE, Bedford College, Dawn Childs, President, Women's Engineering Society, Julie Dakin, Mott Macdonald, Elizabeth Donnelly, CEO, Women's Engineering Society, John McCollum, BAE Systems, Alex Walker, Ford, and Will Whittow, the WES Men As Allies winner 2017, and senior lecturer at Loughborough University.

 Katrina-Rose Allen, Apprentice Engineer, Govia Thameslink Railway (GTR) Ltd
 Natalie Asimeng-Gyan, Engineering Apprentice, GSK
 Natalie Atherton, Zone Operations Manager, Sodexo
 Abbie Beaver, Apprentice Fabricator/Welder, ADI Group
 Jacinta Caden, Business Development (Europe), Critical Project Services
 Sophie Caffrey, Technical Apprentice, Leonardo
 Emily Carr, Apprentice Electrical/Instrumentation Technician, GSK
 Rachael Carr, Senior Systems Engineer, BAE Systems
 Nicole Chamberlain, Automation and MES Engineer, Nestlé
 Melissa Chigubu, Apprentice, Manufacturing Technology Centre (MTC), subsequently employed by GKN Automotive Innovation Centre
 Heather Clarke, Trustee, Institution of Mechanical Engineers (Imeche)
 Lisa-Jayne Cook, Senior Sales and Applications Engineer, Aqua Temperature Control Solutions
 Dr Katherine Critchley, Configuration Management Bpm, Safran Seats
 Alexandra Ellis-Jones, Junior Engineer, GSK
 Jasmine Ewers, Undergraduate Engineer, WSP
 Danielle Flynn, Degree Apprentice, Jaguar Land Rover
 Angela George, Mechanical Design Engineer, Diamond Light Source Ltd
 Natalie Goodman, Permit To Work Coordinator, Spirit Energy
 Bethany Holroyd, Project Coordinator, WSP
 Kelly Jeffery, Civil Engineer, Jacobs
 Grace Johnstone, Principal Engineer, BAE Systems
 Charlotte Jones, Technician, Aecom
 Sharon Lane, Managing Director, Tees Components
 Catherine Leahy, Apprentice Corrosion Technician, TWI
 Chloe Le Grand, Senior Design Engineer, MBDA UK
 Catherine Llewellyn-Jones, Undergraduate Aerospace Engineering Apprentice, Airbus
 Sylvia Lu, 5G Tech Lead, U-Blox UK
 Paula McMahon, Chartered Civil Engineer, Sir Robert McAlpine
 Judith Mair, Manufacturing Laboratory Technologist, Rolls-Royce Plc
 Jenny Manning, Additive Manufacturing Engineering Lead, BAE Systems
 Raisa Matadar, Technical Support Apprentice, Jaguar Land Rover
 Kirsty McDermott, Design Assurance Engineer, National Grid
 Eden McGlen, Apprentice Engineering Maintenance Technician, Unipres
 Lauren McNaughton, Apprentice Building Services Engineer, Arup
 Lois Medley, Electrical Apprentice, WSP
 Sarah Mulvanny, BIM Technician, Arup
 Lesley Nutter, Senior Engineer, Engineering Apprenticeships, BAE Systems
 Emma Roberts, Applications Engineer, Fairfield Control Systems
 Billie Sequeira, Technical Apprentice, BAE Systems
 Jenny Smith, Principal Engineer, MBDA (UK)
 Sophie Smith, Building Surveyor, Atkins
 Sarah Speir, Project Engineer, SP Energy Networks
 Courteney Stone, Engineering Technician Apprentice, BMW Group Manufacturing
 Laurie-Ann Sutherland Smith, Reliability Engineer, Musk Process Services
 Charlotte Tingley, Quality Engineer, BAE Systems
 Tammy Whelan, Assistant Technician, Arup
 Jade White, Welding Engineer, Sellafield
 Perdi Williams, assistant research scientist, National Physical Laboratory
 Ambar Yasin, Apprentice, Jaguar Land Rover
 Daniela Zanni, Structural Technician Apprentice, Arup

2020 Winners (Theme: Sustainability) 
In 2020 the Women's Engineering Society moved away from what women engineers are to what women engineers do and called for nominations for the Top 50 Women in Sustainability. The winners were announced during a live webinar on the 23 June 2020 to celebrate International Women in Engineering Day. The judging panel consisted of Head Judge Sally Sudworth, Environment Agency, Ann-Christin Andersen, Rotork Board Member, Richard Coackley, Past President & Sustainability Leader, Institution of Civil Engineers, Andrew Conway, director of Engineering, BAI Communications, Elizabeth Donnelly, CEO, Women's Engineering Society, Louise Kingham, CEO Institute of Energy, Davide Stronati, Global Sustainability Leader, Mott Macdonald, and Joanna Wood, Group Engineering Director, BAE Systems.

 Yasmin Ali, energy innovation project manager, UK Government, Department of Business, Energy and Industrial Strategy
 Laura Bishop, director, Infinitas Design
 Laura Brown, Energy Research Programme Manager, Newcastle University
 Adele Carey, Senior Sustainability Engineer, Arup
 Ellie Cosgrave, Lecturer In Urban Innovation And Policy, UCL
 Carla Denyer, Councillor, Bristol City Council
 Pamela Dugdale, Engineering Teacher, International Study Centre Liverpool John Moores University
 Rhiannon Evans, Technician, Aecom
 Laura Frost, associate, Cities & Climate Change, Arup
 Ritu Garg, Senior Transport Engineer, Arup
 Barnali Ghosh, Technical Director, Mott Macdonald
 Rachel Gomes, associate professor, Chemical And Environmental Engineering, University of Nottingham
 Deborah Greaves, Head Of School Of Engineering, Computing And Mathematics, University of Plymouth
 Sandy Halliday, director, Gaia Group
 Caireen Hargreaves, Associate Director Product Sustainability, AstraZeneca
 Kelly Harrison, associate, Heyne Tillett Steel
 Martha Hart, Senior Consultant, Arup
 Laura Hepburn, director, Greenology
 Katherine Ibbotson, Programme Carbon And Cost Manager, Environment Agency
 Michelle Johnson, Technical Director, Wood Environment and Infrastructure UK
 Jennifer Kelly, associate, Arup
 Eftychia Koursari, Civil Engineer, Amey
 Clare Lavelle, Energy Consulting Leader - Scotland, Arup
 Claire Lucas, associate professor (Reader), University of Warwick
 Xuanli Luo, research associate, The University of Nottingham
 Brogan MacDonald, Structural Engineer, Ramboll
 Mercedes Maroto-Valer, Champion UK Industrial Decarbonisation Research and Innovation Centre, Heriot-Watt University
 Kerry Mashford, Non-Executive Director, Portfolio
 Senamiso Mathobela, Delivery Manager (TNCC), National Grid UK
 Mhairi McCann, Founder & CEO, Youth STEM 2030
 Gill Nowell, DSO Lead, Electralink
 Rachel Oliver, professor, director of the Cambridge Centre for Gallium Nitride, CSO of Poro Technology, University of Cambridge
 Jo Parker, director, Watershed Associates
 Sally Povolotsky, Low Carbon Business Development Consultant, Straight 6 Design
 Philippa Ross, associate director, Atkins
 Anusha Shah, Director - Resilient Cities, Arcadis
 Sandra Šlihte, Head Of Engineering, Vattenfall Heat UK
 Holly Smith, Civil Engineer, Skanska UK
 Chitra Srinivasan, Real Time Control Software Engineer, UK Atomic Energy Authority
 Annie Stapley, Assistant Engineer, WSP
 Alisa Stratulat, Innovation Manager, Groupe Atlantic
 Judith Sykes, senior director, Expedition Engineering
 Petra Szilágyi, lecturer in Functional Materials, Queen Mary University of London
 Elizabeth Tennyson, Marie Skłodowska-Curie Actions fellow, University of Cambridge
 Camilla Thomson, Chancellor's Fellow In Energy, The University of Edinburgh
 Mi Tian, lecturer, University of Exeter
 Valeska Ting, Professor of Smart Nanomaterials, University of Bristol
 Kusum Trikha, Senior Engineer, WSP
 Jana Marie Weber, PhD candidate, University of Cambridge
 Laura Williams, Health, Safety, Environment and Quality Advisor, Keller

2021 Winners (Theme: Engineering Heroes) 
In 2021 the Women's Engineering Society selected the theme of Engineering Heroes to celebrate the women engineers around the world who played a major role in protecting and defending society from the Covid-19 pandemic. Believing the pandemic to be over by the time of the awards, WES also chose to celebrate women engineers who deliver and maintain critical services and infrastructure, keep civic society functioning at every level, and support lives and livelihoods. The winners were announced on The Guardian and Women's Engineering Society's websites on the 23 June 2021 to celebrate International Women in Engineering Day. A virtual awards ceremony celebrated each winner during a live webinar on the same day.  

The judging panel consisted of Head Judge, Professor Catherine Noakes, Simon Barber, UK Managing Director, Assytem WE50 Sponsor, Dawn Childs FREng, UK Change Director, National Grid, Emma Crichton, head of Engineering, Engineers without Borders, Scott Dalrymple, Vice-President HR, Crane, Elizabeth Donnelly, chief executive officer, Women’s Engineering Society, Neil Gibbs, ABB, Frankie Laugier-Davies, Senior Account Manager, Pareto Facilities Management Ltd, Mark McBride Wright, Equal Engineers, Sarah Mogford, Environment and Planning Divisional Director, RSK,  Emma Nicholson, Development Project Manager, SLC Rail, Steff Smith MWES, chief executive officer, Institute of Measurement and Control, and Mara Tafadzwa Makoni, Association for Black Engineers (AFBE).

 Dr habil Tayebeh Ameri, senior lecturer, University of Edinburgh, School of Engineering
 Samidha Anand, Engineering Manager, Caterpillar UK (Perkins Engines Co Ltd)
 Phoebe Baker, Construction Manager, Mace
 Dr Claire Bennett, Senior Geotechnical Engineer, Arup
 Dr Grace Campbell, Senior Natural Hazard and Risk Specialist, Arup
 Jackie Carpenter, director, Friendship Cohousings
 Dame Jo da Silva, Global Sustainable Development Leader, Arup
 Georgia Davey, Senior Buyer, Babcock International Group
 WO2 Claire Dewhirst, Aircraft Engineer, 1 Regiment AAC Workshop REME (Ministry of Defence)
 Dr Karen Donaldson, research associate, University of Edinburgh
 Professor Hua Dong, professor in Design, Dean of Brunel Design School, Brunel University London
 Dr Katherine Dunn, lecturer, The University of Edinburgh
 Dr Natalia Falagán, lecturer in Food Science and Technology, Cranfield University
 Professor Elena Gaura, Professor of Pervasive Computing, Coventry University
 Kate Grant, director of Network West Midlands, Cadent Gas Limited
 Katherine Grigg, HS2 Main Works Agent, SCS Railways Joint Venture (HS2 Main Works)
 Jo Hartnell, Assistant Tunnelling Engineer, Atkins
 Milly Hennayake, Civil Water Engineer, Arup
 Jean Hewitt, Senior Inclusive Design Consultant, Buro Happold
 Debbie Janson, senior lecturer, University of Bath
 Dr Sohini Kar-Narayan, reader (Associate Professor) in Device & Energy Materials, University of Cambridge
 Emma Kent, Director - Construction, Metropolitan Police
 Dr Suk Kinch, senior design and development engineer, Renishaw Neuro Solutions
 Hanna Leeson, Senior Environmental Engineer, BAE SYSTEMS
 Dr Kristen MacAskill, lecturer, University of Cambridge
 Caitlin McCall, Engineering Doctorate Student, Swansea University and icmPrint
 Linda McVittie, Sales Manager, Scotland, J & E Hall Limited
 Dr Helen Meese, Founder & CEO, The Care Machine Ltd
 Susana Neves e Brooks, Lead Project Manager, National Grid
 Mimi Nwosu, Assistant Materials Engineer, Sir Robert McAlpine
 Jennifer Olsen, PhD researcher, Newcastle University
 Polly Osborne, Assistant Electrical Engineer, Burns & McDonnell
 Dr Cristiana Pace, Founder, E-novation
 Dr Tannaz Pak, senior lecturer in Energy and Environmental Engineering, Teesside University
 Sergeant Sarah Partington, Senior Medical and Dental Technician, Army Medical Services Training Centre
 Kelly Paul, Core Projects Team Lead - UKI, Air Products PLC
 Kayisha Payne, Founder & Programme Director, BBSTEM (Black British Professionals in Science, Technology, Engineering and Maths) Ltd
 Andrea Pearson, Senior Engineer – Operations, Sabic UK Petrochemicals
 Professor Alison Raby, Professor of Environmental Fluid Mechanics, University of Plymouth
 Catherine Rennie, Consultant ENT surgeon, Charing Cross Hospital
 Professor Jane Rickson, Professor of Soil Erosion and Conservation, Cranfield University
 Dr Dipa Roy, senior lecturer, The University of Edinburgh
 Jyoti Sehdev, Group EDI lead, Costain
 Era Shah, Senior Engineer - HS2 Enabling Works, Costain Skanska Joint Venture (HS2 Enabling Works)
 Professor Rebecca Shipley, Professor of Healthcare Engineering, UCL
 Dr Maria Sunyer Pinya, Senior Climate Change Consultant, Arup
 Dr Larissa Suzuki, Data/AI Practice Lead, Google
 Sue Threader, Bridge Clerk (Chief Executive), Rochester Bridge Trust
 Hannah Vickers, Chief Executive, Association for Consultancy and Engineering
 Julie Wood, director, Arup

2022 Winners (Theme: Inventors and Innovators) 
In 2022 the Women's Engineering Society selected the theme of Inventors and Innovators to celebrate the women engineers who demonstrated the creation or improvement of a product or process that makes a difference. The winners were announced on The Guardian and Women's Engineering Society's websites on the 23 June 2022 to celebrate International Women in Engineering Day. The awards were planned to be given at a ceremony at the Institution of Civil Engineers on the same day, but a rail strike on the same day, resulted in its postponement.

 Hannah Abend, chief operating officer, Wood Thilsted
 Dr Tosin Adedipe-Elusakin, Technical Project Coordinator, Cranfield University
 Ruth Amos, Inventor, Stairsteady/ Kids Invent Stuff
 Mercedes Ascaso Til, Principal Engineer, DLT Engineering Ltd. (formerly Dorman Long Technology)
 Eleanor Ball, Co-founder and director, Graphic Structures
 Hani Baluch, Solutions Delivery Manager, bp
 Divya Bhanderi, Senior Engineer, Arup
 Dr Qianyu Chen, research fellow, University of Birmingham
 Jessica Coldrey, Digital Skills Mentor, Birmingham Open Media
 Evelyn Cropper, Technical Manager, Stirling Dynamics
 Philippa Davies, Engineering Director, Reaction Engines Limited
 Beth Dickens, director, Quoceant Ltd
 Dr Ama Frimpong, head of Product Development, 52 North Health
 Dr Jennifer Glover, Graduate Acoustic Consultant, AECOM
 Bethany Hall, Electrical Engineer Aerospace, Rolls-Royce/Aerospace Technology Institute
 Dr Yiheng Hu, PhD researcher, University of Huddersfield
 Rowena Innocent, Group Head of STEM strategy, Spectris plc
 Tina Irvine, Engineer, Arup
 Dr Ornella Iuorio, Associate Prof., University of Leeds
 Prof Caroline Jay, head of Research, School of Engineering, University of Manchester
 Alice Kan, Pharmaceutical Director, Kan Do Ventures
 Prof Eiman Kanjo, professor and head of Smart Sensing Lab, Nottingham Trent University
 Natalie Kerres, CEO, founder, NK Technology Ltd. (SCALED)
 Palvisha Khan, EMEA Strategy and Transformation Lead, Reliance Worldwide Corporation
 Dr Alalea Kia, research fellow, Imperial College London
 Lucie Killen, Structural Engineer, Price & Myers
 Guneet Kohli, Engineer, Arup
 Marisa Kurimbokus, Mechanical Engineering Team Leader, Aeristech Ltd
 Sarah Lu, PhD Researcher, University of Southampton
 Noor Mansur, Senior Electronics Engineer, Dyson Technology Ltd.
 Prof Serena Margadonna, head of the School of Engineering and Applied Sciences, Swansea University
 Prof Gabriela Medero, professor in Geotechnical and Geoenvironmental Engineering, Heriot-Watt University
 Dr Nausheen Sultana Mehboob Basha, Project Manager and researcher, Imperial College London
 Prof Aline Miller, professor and Associate Dead, University of Manchester
 Sophie V Morse, research fellow, Imperial College London
 Dr Youmna Mouhamad, Royal Academy Enterprise Fellow 2020, Myana Naturals Ltd
 Dr Priti Parikh, associate professor, Bartlett School of Sustainable Construction, head of Engineering for International Development Centre
 Krystina Pearson-Rampeearee, Senior Flight System Engineer, BAE Systems
 Rachel Pether, director of Water Utilities, Consultancy, Binnies UK
 Dr Agnieszka Rutkowska, Electrochemistry Lead, Depixus
 Prof Lidija Šiller, Professor of Nanoscale Science, Newcastle University
 Radhika Srinivasan, CEO & Founder, EcoTextura
 Swati, director, Anant Biomedical Limited
 Sarah Teliani, Project Manager, Arup
 Dr Navya Thomas, research fellow in Membrane Crystallisation, Cranfield University
 Georgia Thompson, Assistant Design Programme Manager, BAM Nuttall
 Carolina Toczycka, Co-founder and Chief Commercial Officer, Lenz Labs
 Georgina Wharton, director of Technology, Parkside Community School
 Jane Wright, Emerging Leaders Scheme (Decarbonisation Strategy and Engineering), Transport for London (TfL)
 Nadja Yang, President, European Young Engineers

The judging panel consisted of the following: 

 Dr Bola Olabisi – Founder & CEO of the Global Women Inventors & Innovators Network (GlobalWIIN) (Head Judge) 
 Lauren Touré – Diversity & Inclusion Manager, Ball Beverage Packaging EMEA (WE50 Sponsor)
 Dawn Childs FREng – CEO, Pure Data Centres (Operations), and President, Women's Engineering Society
 Carl Hayward – Business Excellence Manager, Costa Coffee Express
 Dr Giorgia Longobardi – CEO, Cambridge GaN Devices
 Mara Makoni – Consultant, PA Consulting & Board Member, Association For Black Engineers
 Dr Mark McBride-Wright CEng MIChemE – Founder and Managing Director, Equal Engineers
 Libby Meyrick – Chief Executive, Institution of Engineering Designers
 Susan Robson – Principal Consultant, National Grid & Board Member, Women's Engineering Society
 Emily Spearman – Head of PMO, Orsted & Board Member, Women's Engineering Society

References

External links
 Top 50 Influential Women in Engineering
 National Women in Engineering Day
 International Women in Engineering Day

Lists of engineers
Lists of women
2016 works